The Thimpu principles or Thimpu Declaration were a set of four demands put forward by the Sri Lankan Tamil delegation at the first peace talks undertaken regarding the Sri Lankan civil war. In July–August 1985 the Indian government organised peace talks in Thimphu, Bhutan aimed at bringing an end to the Sri Lankan civil war between Sri Lankan Tamil militant groups and the government of Sri Lanka. The declaration made by the Tamil delegation at Thimphu, in response to a government proposal, has come to be known as the Thimpu Declaration or Thimpu principles.

Introduction
The Sri Lankan government delegation consisted of Hector Jayawardene (President Junius Jayewardene's brother), three lawyers, and an attorney. The Tamil delegation consisted of representatives from the Eelam People's Revolutionary Liberation Front (EPRLF), Eelam Revolutionary Organisation of Students (EROS), Liberation Tigers of Tamil Eelam (LTTE), People's Liberation Organisation of Tamil Eelam (PLOTE), Tamil Eelam Liberation Organisation (TELO) and Tamil United Liberation Front (TULF).

The Sri Lankan government delegation proposed draft legislation for devolution of power but this was rejected by the Tamil delegation. On 13 July the Tamil delegation responded, issuing the Thimpu Declaration with four key demands (the cardinal principles). The four cardinal principles became known as the Thimpu principles.

Thimpu Declaration
The declaration stated:

The Sri Lankan government rejected all but the last principle as they violated Sri Lanka's sovereignty.

The peace talks collapsed on 18 August due to the intransigence of both delegations.

See also
Sri Lankan civil war
Sri Lankan Tamil nationalism

References

1985 documents
1985 in Sri Lanka
Sri Lankan Tamil politics
India–Sri Lanka relations
Indian Peace Keeping Force
Foreign intervention in the Sri Lankan Civil War